This list of politics awards is an index to articles that describe notable awards related to politics. It includes awards for political science, for governance and civic leadership, and for books on political subjects. The list gives the country of the sponsoring organization, but awards are not necessarily limited to people from that country.

See also

 Lists of awards
 Awards and honors presented to the 14th Dalai Lama

References

 
Politics